Janet C. Long (born November 6, 1944) is a  Democratic politician and educator who serves as a member of the  Florida House of Representatives for House District 51. She was a member of the Seminole, Florida City Council from 2002 to 2006. She was first elected to the Florida Legislature in 2006, and was re-elected in 2008.

Biography

Long was born in West Stewartstown, New Hampshire.  She graduated from Fryeburg Academy. She attended Nasson College, Eckerd College and St. Petersburg College, but obtained no degree. She is the director of advancement at Clearwater Central Catholic High School.

Long gained political experience as a legislative aide and as a deputy commissioner for the Florida Department of Insurance.

She is married to Richard L. Long with three children, Anissa, Paul, and Richard, and two grandchildren. Her son Paul was nominated to receive the Distinguished Flying Cross for his heroism in Afghanistan May 18, 2008.

Political career

Seminole City Council

Long announced her candidacy for one of three available seats on the Seminole City Council in November 2001. At the time, she owned a consulting firm and served on the tree advisory committee. She was also a member of  the Greater Seminole Area Chamber of Commerce Board of Directors, and served on the governor's tax reform task force.

The Greater Seminole Area Chamber of Commerce held a forum for the City Council candidates in February 2002. Each candidate had a brief time to make an opening statement, answer two questions, and make a closing statement. Long cited her three decades of experience, including her advocacy work with the Insurance Commission, her work on government committees, and her receptiveness to community input. She advocated care in annexation. She received the support of the Seminole Professional Fire Fighters Association. She was elected to the Seminole City Council in March 2002, her first publicly elected office. Of the three people elected to the council in that race, she had the most votes.

In 2003, she supported levying fines for false fire alarms. The fines would increase after with the fourth false alarm in a twelve-month period. The legislation addressed concerns that false alarm response was reducing the availability of fire fighters. About ten percent of the fire department's calls had been to false alarms, with most of those due to faulty alarm systems.

She also favored the changing the name of the city's signature festival, the "Seminole Pow Wow." The name was considered offensive, and politically incorrect, as well as inappropriate as being totally unrelated to Native American culture.

She ran unopposed for re-election to the City Council in 2004. In 2005, a resolution by the U.S. Conference of Mayors Climate Protection Agreement urged cities to "take actions to reduce global warming pollution."  The Seminole City Council declined to support the resolution by a vote of four opposed to three in support. Long voted to support the resolution, along with Mayor Dottie Reeder and Patricia Hartstein.

Florida Legislature

2006 campaign
In her first state legislative campaign, Long was elected to the Florida House in 2006, narrowly defeating  her former colleague, former Seminole Mayor Dottie Reeder.
She replaced Leslie Waters, who had been term limited out, and who declined to run for the District 51 seat in 2008.
Long had run unopposed in the Democratic primary.
Long had resigned her position on the Council in March 2006, saying that it would be a conflict of interest to continue on the council while running for State office. She chided Mayor Reeder for remaining as mayor while campaigning.
At a Seminole Chamber of Commerce luncheon meeting in February 2006, Long identified education, insurance, and affordable housing as top priorities.

During the campaign, Long suggested solutions for the Florida insurance crisis, while acknowledging the complexity of the issues. She recommended making Citizen's Property Insurance Co, the state-run "insurer of last resort," more like a business, assessing risk and operating within a balanced budget. She recommended forming a consortium of coastal states to share costs in dealing with windstorms and catastrophic loss. She also recommended looking into "insurance savings accounts" to deal with catastrophic loses. These accounts would be funded with money from premiums paid by citizens and the private insurers. She received the endorsement of the St. Petersburg Times,
as well as the Tampa Bay Builders Association and The Pinellas Realtor Organization.

2006–2008 term
As a freshman representative, Long was appointed to the Insurance Committee, the Education Innovation & Career Preparation Committee, Military & Veterans' Affairs Committee, and the Schools & Learning Council. She was one of three Pinellas County representatives to support school vouchers (corporate-tax-credit scholarships), along with Bill Heller and Darryl Rouson.

Long used her office to champion unincorporated residents within her district, who felt they were not receiving adequate benefits from the Pinellas Park Water Management District. The district builds and maintains drainage projects in mid-Pinellas County. Residents in the Bayou Club and Lealman areas did not feel they received direct benefits from the water management district, and that they should be able to opt out of paying taxes to it. The District responded that Bayou Club would not exist without the drainage system it provided. Representative Long sought to have the matter decided by referendum.

Long sponsored a bill that would prohibit local governments from spending public money on "political advertisement or electioneering communication."
She opposed a 2008 bill, HB 257, that required pregnant women to have a sonogram before undergoing a first-trimester abortion. She and state Senator Dennis L. Jones supported legislative action to require airports, universities and state agencies to recycle.  Opponents of the bill said it would cost too much.

In August 2008, Long told the Pinellas Park Kiwanis Club that she supports taxing Internet sales as a possible solution to state budget problems. She said that Florida had grown markedly since the tax codes were first written, and that they needed updating.

2008 campaign
Prior to the 2008 election, Long spoke of the need to create a wind insurance program and improve property insurance. She also expressed concern over the tax burden of low-income seniors, first-time home buyers, and small business owners. She advocated improvements in health care, such as electronic record keeping and affordable drugs for seniors. She received the endorsement of the Sierra Club and the St. Petersburg Times. The Republican Party was impressed enough with her that it  invited her to change parties. The Times lauded what it called her "clear-headedness" for her stances on reviewing special taxing districts (such as the Pinellas Park Water Management District), looking into consolidating state law enforcement agencies, and modifying  the requirements for Bright Futures scholarships.

2008–2012 term
In 2008, Long defeated Republican Christopher Peters, a lifeguard at Fort De Soto Park, with 58 percent of the vote. He was a substitute candidate, recruited to run after Republican Terry Sanchez withdrew her candidacy in September. After the election, Long said she looked forward to working on tax reform and health care legislation.

Bibliography

References

1944 births
Living people
People from Coös County, New Hampshire
Democratic Party members of the Florida House of Representatives
People from Seminole, Florida
Women state legislators in Florida
Florida city council members
Eckerd College alumni
Nasson College alumni
Women city councillors in Florida
Catholics from Florida
Catholics from New Hampshire
21st-century American women